Martin Olav Sabo (February 28, 1938 – March 13, 2016) was an American politician who served as United States Representative for , which includes Minneapolis; the district is one of eight congressional districts in Minnesota.

Early life and education
Sabo was born in Crosby, North Dakota, the son of Norwegian immigrant parents. He received a B.A. from Augsburg College in Minneapolis in 1959, later pursuing graduate studies at the University of Minnesota.

Career

Minnesota Legislature 
He was elected to the Minnesota House of Representatives in 1960 at the age of 22, later serving as minority leader (1969–72) and as the first Democrat to serve as house speaker (1973–78). During his tenure in the state house he served terms as president of the National Conference of State Legislatures and of the National Legislative Conference, and was a presidential appointee to the National Advisory Commission on Intergovernmental Relations.

U.S. Congress 
When eight-term incumbent and fellow Democratic–Farmer–Labor Party (DFL) member Donald M. Fraser stepped down to run for the U.S. Senate, Sabo became the DFL candidate to succeed him in what had become the most reliably Democratic district in Minnesota (Fraser had defeated a 10-term Republican in 1962 and hadn't faced serious opposition since). He won easily in November 1978 and was reelected thirteen times without serious opposition, serving in the 96th, 97th, 98th, 99th, 100th, 101st, 102nd, 103rd, 104th, 105th, 106th, 107th, 108th and 109th congresses.

During the 103rd Congress (1993–94) he chaired the House Budget Committee. As chairman of the Committee, he shepherded the Omnibus Budget Reconciliation Act of 1993 through the House, legislation that allowed the United States to erase its budget deficit by 1999. (The deficit subsequently returned.) In the 109th United States Congress he sat on the House Appropriations Committee, and was the ranking member of that committee's Homeland Security subcommittee.

A Lutheran, Sabo was married and had two children and six grandchildren. His daughter, Julie Sabo, is a former member of the Minnesota Senate and was the 2002 DFL nominee for Lieutenant Governor of Minnesota. Sabo was inducted into the Scandinavian-American Hall of Fame in 1994. During the course of his career Sabo referred to himself as a "liberal decentrist", preferring progressive politics, but local control instead of federal control.

Sabo was considered to be the most liberal member of the Minnesota delegation in the 109th Congress, scoring 4% conservative by a conservative group and 90% progressive by a liberal group.

Later career 
On March 18, 2006, he announced that he would not seek reelection for the 110th Congress, ending 46 years as an elected official, including 28 years in Congress – the second-longest tenure in either house of Congress in the state's history, behind only fellow Democrat Jim Oberstar. He endorsed his longtime chief of staff, Mike Erlandson, in the DFL primary—the real contest in this district. Erlandson lost to State Representative Keith Ellison, also a progressive DFLer, who won the general election and succeeded Sabo on January 4, 2007.

Sabo served as a co-chair of the National Transportation Policy Project at the Bipartisan Policy Center. For his work on acquiring funding for transportation projects and specifically pedestrian and bicycling funding, the Midtown Greenway bridge in Minneapolis was named the Martin Olav Sabo Bridge.

Personal life
Sabo died March 13, 2016, in Minneapolis, Minnesota, at the age of 78. He had been hospitalized with breathing difficulties.

U.S Senator Amy Klobuchar called Sabo a "friend and mentor," and Governor Mark Dayton praised him as "a great political leader and an outstanding public servant." Sabo was a lifelong smoker until he quit in 2003.

Electoral history
2004 race for U.S. House of Representatives – 5th district
Martin Olav Sabo (DFL) (inc.), 70%
Daniel Mathias (R), 24%
Jay Pond (G), 6%

References

External links
Minnesota Legislators Past and Present

Martin Sabo legislative and congressional papers are available for research at the Minnesota Historical Society

1938 births
2016 deaths
American people of Norwegian descent
American Lutherans
Politicians from Minneapolis
Speakers of the Minnesota House of Representatives
People from Divide County, North Dakota
Augsburg University alumni
University of Minnesota alumni
Democratic Party members of the United States House of Representatives from Minnesota
20th-century American politicians
21st-century American politicians
20th-century Lutherans